Machine diagnosis may refer to:
Machine fault diagnosis, diagnosis made on a machine
Clinical decision support system, diagnosis assisted by a machine